Ctenophthalmidae is a family of fleas belonging to the order Siphonaptera.

Genera:
 Actenophthalmus Fox, 1925
 Euctenophthalmus Wagner, 1940
 Medioctenophthalmus Hopkins & Rothschild, 1966
 Palaeoctenophthalmus Wagner, 1940
 Peusianapsylla Beaucournu & Wunderlich, 2001
 Spalacoctenophthalmus Wagner, 1940

References

Fleas
Insect families